Trest may refer to:
 Třešť, a town in the Vysočina Region of the Czech Republic
 Trade name for Metixene
 TREST, a Soviet deception operation also called "Trust"